City Without Baseball (jyutping: mou4 je5 zi1 sing4) is a 2008 Hong Kong drama film starring Ron Heung and other members of the Hong Kong National Baseball Team. It is directed by South African-born Hong Kong filmmaker Lawrence Ah Mon, about a city where baseball is almost unknown, and where the team plays to empty stadia.

The film explores several themes traditionally regarded as 'taboo' in Hong Kong society. The film is the first of seven such films by Scud (the production-crediting name of Hong Kong writer/film producer Danny Cheng Wan-Cheung). The six later films are: Permanent Residence in 2009, Amphetamine in 2010, Love Actually... Sucks! in 2011, Voyage in 2013, Utopians in 2015 and Thirty Years of Adonis in 2017. His eighth film, Apostles, was made in 2022, as was his ninth, Bodyshop.

His tenth and final film, Naked Nations: Hong Kong Tribe, is currently in production.

Plot
The actual members of the Hong Kong National Baseball Team appear in the film as themselves, in a story set in 2004. Their isolated existence leads them to take unconventional choices in both love and friendship, and to summon great courage in the face of their lonely and disconnected existence.
The story focuses on the easy-going, yet often detached, main character, Ronnie, as played by Ron Heung, and his friendships and relationships with others, both on and off the sports field.

Cast
 Yu Chung Leung as Chung - Pitcher
 Ron Heung as Ron - Pitcher (as Tze Chun Ron Heung)
 John Tai as Coach Tai
 Jason Tsang as Jason - Catcher
 Jose Au as Jose - Captain (billed as Wing Leung Jose Au)
 Yu Hong Lau as Hong - Second Baseman
 Peter Mak as Peter - Right Outfielder
 Herman Chan as Wah - Middle Outfielder
 Jackie Chow as Jackie - Third Baseman
 Julian Chiu as Julian - First Baseman
 Kenneth Chiu as Kenneth - Pitcher
 Yuan Lin as Meizi (billed as Gia Lin)
 Monie Tung as Kim
 Wei-Sha Yan as Ping (billed as Wei Sha Yan)
 Sean Au as Sir Au
 Allan Mak as Sir Mak
 David Wong as Sir Wong
 Ryan Williams as Kevin
 Calina Chan as Ron's mother
 Winky Wong as Ron's sister
 Belinda Reed as Chung's blonde girlfriend
 Anjo Leung as Bartender / Violinist
 Sean Li as Bartender
 Thomas Price as Daniel / Cable guy (billed as Tom Price)
 Thomas Lee as Ron's new room-mate (billed as Chi Wai Thomas Lee)
 Stanley Kong as Jose's boss
 Heman Peng as Record producer
 Debbie Li as Producer's assistant
 Sammy Andres Jr. as Lead singer
 Ka Wai Chan as Double Bass Player
 Ying Leung Lau as Doctor
 Eva Lo as Ron's ex-girlfriend (billed as Hiu Pui Eva Lo)
 Jimmie Poon as Librarian man
 Shuk Kwan Chen as Ping's Double
 Scud as Teammate

Awards
 2008 Hong Kong Film Critics Society Awards Winners for Top 7 Suggested Films
 2008 Taiwan Film Critics Society Awards Winners for Top 10 Best Chinese Films

Home media
A Panorama Distributions Co.:
 VCD first became available on 2008-10-03 (3 October 2008)
 DVD (DVD Region 3) first became available on 2008-10-10 (10 October 2008)
 Blu-ray Disc first became available on 2011-06-03 (3 June 2011)

See also
 Hong Kong films of 2008
 List of lesbian, gay, bisexual or transgender-related films
 List of lesbian, gay, bisexual, or transgender-related films by storyline
 Nudity in film (East Asian cinema since 1929)

References

Further reading

External links
  
 
 
 City Without Baseball in the Chinese Movie Database
 'Mike Reviews' film entry
City Without Baseball at LoveHKFilm
City Without Baseball at Hong Kong Cinemagic

2008 films
2008 LGBT-related films
2000s sports drama films
Chinese baseball films
2000s Cantonese-language films
Chinese independent films
Chinese sports drama films
Chinese LGBT-related films
Films directed by Lawrence Ah Mon
Films set in 2004
Films set in Hong Kong
Gay-related films
Hong Kong sports drama films
Hong Kong independent films
Hong Kong LGBT-related films
LGBT-related drama films
Male bisexuality in film
2008 drama films
2000s Hong Kong films